Noel Fülöp (born 29 January 1988) is a Hungarian football player who plays for MTK II.

Career statistics
.

External links 
 HLSZ
 Ferencvarosi Torna Club Official Website
 

1988 births
Living people
People from Százhalombatta
Hungarian footballers
Association football defenders
Mosonmagyaróvári TE 1904 footballers
Ferencvárosi TC footballers
Szigetszentmiklósi TK footballers
BFC Siófok players
Soroksár SC players
Monori SE players
MTK Budapest FC players
Tiszakécske FC footballers
Nemzeti Bajnokság I players
Nemzeti Bajnokság II players
Nemzeti Bajnokság III players
Sportspeople from Pest County